Uqba ibn Amir al-Juhani (died 677/78) was a companion of the Islamic prophet Muhammad and the Umayyad governor of Egypt in 665–667 and died in the province.

Life
Uqba ibn Amir hailed from the Juhayna tribe, a branch of the Quda'a confederation resident across Syria and northwestern Arabia. He became a well-known companion of the Islamic prophet Muhammad and had been the latter's muleteer. Uqba was also a poet and became known for his writing skills. He developed a reputation as an early reader of the Quran and possessed a version of the Muslim holy book that was different than the version descended from Caliph Uthman. His recension of the Quran fell into oblivion after the Umayyad governor of Egypt, Abd al-Aziz ibn Marwan, had another codex produced in accordance with the Uthmanid canon. Uqba is credited with the transmission of several hadith (traditions of Muhammad).

During the First Muslim Civil War, he was an active supporter of his friend Mu'awiya ibn Abi Sufyan against Caliph Ali. Mu'awiya became caliph in 661 and appointed Uqba the governor of Egypt, replacing the caliph's deceased brother, Utba ibn Abi Sufyan, in 664. According to the 9th-century historian al-Tabari, in 668/69, Uqba led the Arab troops of Egypt alongside the troops of Medina in a naval raid against Byzantine territory. He was replaced as governor by Maslama ibn Mukhallad al-Ansari in 669. He died in Egypt in 677/78. An honorary tomb was built on his grave in the cemetery of Qarafa al-Kubra near Fustat. During the Mamluk period in the 14th century, it was one of several ziyarat (Muslim pilgrimage sites) visited by Egyptian Muslims.

References

Bibliography

678 deaths
7th-century Umayyad governors of Egypt
People of the First Fitna
Quda'a
Sahabah hadith narrators
Umayyad people of the Arab–Byzantine wars
Year of birth unknown